

The Farman B.2 was a 1920s French biplane designed as a light day bomber. Only one was built.

Development
Farman Aviation Works designed and built in 1924 what was a bulky unequal span two-bay biplane for use as a day bomber. The pilot had a cockpit forward of the wing leading edge, the observer/gunner had a cockpit in a cut-out in the wing trailing edge. The B.2 was tested with different combinations of engines and radiators and it required modification to the fin and rudder for problems with directional stability. Despite all these modifications the aircraft did not meet the required performance and was not ordered into production.

Specifications

Notes

Bibliography

1920s French bomber aircraft
B.2